Óscar Cecilio Surián Roda (born 7 August 1959) is a Paraguayan former footballer, who played as a centre back. He played football most of his career with Libertad.

International 
Surián was a member of the Paraguay national U-20 squad that competed in the 1979 FIFA World Youth Championship and was also part of the Paraguay national football team that participated in the 1983 Copa América.

References

External links
 

1959 births
Living people
Paraguayan footballers
Paraguay international footballers
Paraguayan expatriate footballers
Association football defenders
1983 Copa América players
Club Libertad footballers
Sport Colombia footballers
Atlético Colegiales players
Sportspeople from Asunción